Clothing in the United Arab Emirates is similar in characteristic of Arabic countries and has aspect of the Bedouin life in the Arabian peninsula. Traditional clothing is designed for comfort in high temperatures and to keep with the Islamic religious beliefs in the country. Emiratis wear veils and long sleeved robes, worn especially in the summer. Clothing that cover more parts of the body from the sunlight can be preferred.

Sandals are the common footwear for both Emirati women and men with elements such as open-toe designs with no slingback or strap behind the heel. 

A social media campaign was started by two Emirati women, Hanan Al Rayes and Asma Al Muhairi, in 2012 to create awareness and educate tourists and expatriates on dressing appropriately, respecting the country's culture and sensibilities.

Gallery

See also 
 Culture of the United Arab Emirates
 National costume

References

Bibliography 
 Benesh, G. C. (2008). CultureShock! United Arab Emirates: A survival guide to customs and etiquette. Singapore: Marshall Cavendish International (Asia) Ptd Ltd.

Emirati clothing